Brandon Feehery (born April 17, 1992) is an American professional racing cyclist. He rode in the men's team time trial at the 2015 UCI Road World Championships.

Major results

2012
 1st Villa Park Grand Prix
2014
 3rd Overall Tour of America's Dairyland
 3rd Overall 
2015
 1st Lincoln Park Criterium
 1st Stage 4 Tour of America's Dairyland
 4th White Spot / Delta Road Race
2017
 1st Stage 11 Tour of America's Dairyland
 1st Stage 1 Sunshine Grand Prix
 2nd Overall 
1st Stage 10
 3rd Crystal Cup
2018
 1st Marian Midwest Classic
 2nd Overall 
1st Stage 1
2019
 1st Overall 
2021
 1st Shorewood Criterium Cycling Classic
 1st Stage 8 Tour of America's Dairyland
 2nd Overall 
1st Stage 9
2022
 1st American Criterium Cup
 2nd Overall

References

External links

1992 births
Living people
American male cyclists
People from Homewood, Illinois
Sportspeople from Illinois
Cyclists from Illinois